The knock-out stage of the 2013 AFC Champions League was played from 14 May to 9 November 2013. A total of 16 teams competed in the knock-out stage.

Qualified teams
The winners and runners-up of each of the eight groups in the group stage qualified for the knock-out stage. Both West Zone and East Zone had eight teams qualified.

Format
In the knock-out stage, the 16 teams played a single-elimination tournament. Each tie was played on a home-and-away two-legged basis. The away goals rule, extra time (away goals do not apply in extra time) and penalty shoot-out were used to decide the winner if necessary.

Schedule
The schedule of each round was as follows.

Bracket
In the round of 16, the winners of one group played the runners-up of another group in the same zone, with the group winners hosting the second leg. The matchups were determined as follows:

West Zone
Winner Group A vs. Runner-up Group C
Winner Group C vs. Runner-up Group A
Winner Group B vs. Runner-up Group D
Winner Group D vs. Runner-up Group B

East Zone
Winner Group E vs. Runner-up Group G
Winner Group G vs. Runner-up Group E
Winner Group F vs. Runner-up Group H
Winner Group H vs. Runner-up Group F

The draw for the quarter-finals, semi-finals, and final (to decide the order of two legs) was held on 20 June 2013, 16:00 UTC+8, at the AFC House in Kuala Lumpur, Malaysia. In this draw, teams from different zones could play each other, and the "country protection" rule was applied: if there are exactly two teams from the same association, they may not play each other in the quarter-finals; however, if there are more than two teams from the same association, they may play each other in the quarter-finals.

Round of 16
The first legs were played on 14 and 15 May 2013, and the second legs were played on 21 and 22 May 2013.

|-
|+West Zone

|}

|+East Zone

|}

First leg

Second leg

FC Seoul won 3–1 on aggregate.

Buriram United won 2–1 on aggregate.

Al-Ahli won 3–1 on aggregate.

Al-Shabab won 5–1 on aggregate.

Kashiwa Reysol won 5–2 on aggregate.

Guangzhou Evergrande won 5–1 on aggregate.

Lekhwiya won 3–2 on aggregate.

Esteghlal won 4–2 on aggregate.

Quarter-finals
The first legs were played on 21 August 2013, and the second legs were played on 18 September 2013.

|}

First leg

Second leg

FC Seoul won 2–1 on aggregate.

Esteghlal won 3–1 on aggregate.

Guangzhou Evergrande won 6–1 on aggregate.

3–3 on aggregate. Kashiwa Reysol won on away goals.

Semi-finals
The first legs were played on 25 September 2013, and the second legs were played on 2 October 2013.

|}

First leg

Second leg

Guangzhou Evergrande won 8–1 on aggregate.

FC Seoul won 4–2 on aggregate.

Final

The first leg was played on 26 October 2013, and the second leg was played on 9 November 2013.

|}

3–3 on aggregate. Guangzhou Evergrande won on away goals.

References

External links

3